Heussler is a surname. Notable people with the surname include:

Bob Heussler, American sports announcer
John Heussler (1820–1907), Johann Christian Heussler, politician in Queensland, Australia
Olivia Heussler (born 1957), Swiss photographer

See also
Hessler